Lisa Maria Ellram is the James Evans Rees Distinguished Professor of Supply Chain at the Farmer School of Business.

Early life and education
Ellram grew up in Minnesota and earned her BSB degree in accounting and MBA from the University of Minnesota. She then traveled to Ohio to earn her Master's degree (logistics) and PhD (management) from Ohio State University. While earning her doctorate, she worked for the Pillsbury Company as an accountant.

Career
Upon earning her PhD, Ellram joined the faculty department of purchasing, logistics and operations at Arizona State University's (ASU) W. P. Carey School of Business. During her tenure at ASU, Ellram was recognized as one of 30 "Practitioner Pros to Know" in a list published by Supply & Demand Chain Executive for having  "a deep breadth of knowledge about the industry and are forward-thinking in their approach to the evolving supply chain network." She was also appointed to John and Barbara Bebbling Professor of Business until her departure in 2006, when she left ASU to accept a chair appointment at  Colorado State University's department of management.

Ellram's stay in Colorado was short as she quickly accepted a James Evans Rees Distinguished Professor of Supply Chain position at the Farmer School of Business in 2008. She became a co-editor of the Journal of Supply Chain Management, during which it was added to the Thomson Reuters ISI Web of Knowledge. By 2018, Ellram became first Farmer School faculty member to be honored by the University as a Distinguished Scholar and the first to be named a University Distinguished Professor.

Publications
 Total cost modeling in purchasing, 1994
 Purchasing for bottom line impact : improving the organization through strategic procurement, 1995
 Outsourcing : implications for supply management, 1997
 The role of supply management in target costing, 1999
 Supply management for value enhancement, 2000
 Sourcing to support the green initiative, 2013

References

External links
 

Living people
Carlson School of Management alumni
Ohio State University Fisher College of Business alumni
Arizona State University faculty
Colorado State University faculty
Miami University faculty
Academics from Minnesota
20th-century American non-fiction writers
21st-century American non-fiction writers
20th-century American women writers
21st-century American women writers
Year of birth missing (living people)
American women academics